The 1998 Pep Boys Indy Racing League was one of relative stability compared to the previous two seasons. For the first time the season consisted of a single and complete spring, summer, and fall like all other forms of motorsport. 15 drivers completed the entire 11 race schedule, twice as many as the previous season. It was also the first complete season for the new Riley & Scott chassis, though it proved unpopular due to its late introduction. A. J. Foyt Enterprises drivers captured 4 wins, the Indy 500 pole, and the championship, arguably the most successful year in the team's history.

Confirmed entries

Season summary

Schedule 

All races running on Oval/Speedway.

The eight races that were held in calendar year 1997 returned in 1998, with the addition of three new races. As part of their effort to venture in traditional stock-car markets, the IRL held the second Indy-car race ever, the first since 1969, at Dover International Speedway, and also competed at the reconfigured Atlanta Motor Speedway, which had been raced eight times by Indy-cars in its former shape between 1965 and 1983. A second race at Texas Motor Speedway in the fall completed the calendar.

Race results

Race summaries

Indy 200
The Indy 200 was held on January 24 at Walt Disney World Speedway. Qualifying was rained out, so Tony Stewart won the pole position due to the race being lined up by 1996–97 entrant standings for the first 20 positions and the remaining eight came from the best practice speeds of the remaining cars.

Top 10 results
 1- Tony Stewart
 35- Jeff Ward
 6- Davey Hamilton
 77- Stéphan Grégoire
 28- Mark Dismore
 8- Scott Sharp
 10- Mike Groff
 5- Arie Luyendyk
 99- Sam Schmidt
 18- John Paul Jr.

Dura-Lube 200
The Dura-Lube 200 was held on March 22 at Phoenix International Raceway. Jeff Ward qualified on the pole position.

Top 10 results
 8- Scott Sharp
 1- Tony Stewart
 11- Billy Boat
 77- Stéphan Grégoire
 35- Jeff Ward
 4- Scott Goodyear
 99- Sam Schmidt
 30- Raul Boesel
 12- Buzz Calkins
 51- Eddie Cheever
Failed to qualify: 19-Stan Wattles, 27-Robbie Groff, 40-Jack Miller and 53-Jim Guthrie

Indianapolis 500
The Indianapolis 500 was held on May 24 at Indianapolis Motor Speedway. Billy Boat qualified on the pole position.

Top ten results
 51- Eddie Cheever
 91- Buddy Lazier
 55- Steve Knapp
 6- Davey Hamilton
 52- Robby Unser
 14- Kenny Bräck
 81- John Paul Jr.
 17- Andy Michner
 44- J. J. Yeley
 12- Buzz Calkins
Failed to qualify: 10-Brian Tyler, 10, 20, 29-Joe Gosek, 15, 19-Eliseo Salazar, 20-Tyce Carlson, 23-Paul Durant, 24-Dan Drinan, 27-Claude Bourbonnais, 54-Hideshi Matsuda, 66-Scott Harrington, 68-Jaques Lazier, 81-Danny Ongais and 90-Lyn St. James
Cheever became the first owner/driver to win the Indianapolis 500 since A. J. Foyt in 1977.
Cheever, whose team was unsponsored prior to this race, planned to shut down his team after the race. However, he and teammate Robby Unser received sponsorship from Rachel's Gourmet Potato Chips. This, combined with Cheever's victory, kept the team open the rest of the season.
Because St. James failed to qualify, the starting lineup consisted of only men for the first time since 1991.
On the first lap, Yeley spun out and collected Cheever. Both recovered to finish in the top 10.
Bräck ran out of fuel while leading. As a result, owner Foyt threw the laptop computer that said that Bräck had enough fuel in anger.

True Value 500
The True Value 500 was held June 6 at Texas Motor Speedway. Tony Stewart qualified on the pole position.

Top 10 results
 11- Billy Boat
 97- Greg Ray
 14- Kenny Bräck
 4- Scott Goodyear
 8- Scott Sharp
 3- Robbie Buhl
 6- Davey Hamilton
 16- Marco Greco
 52- Robby Unser
 19- Stan Wattles
Failed to qualify: 7-Jimmy Kite, 10-Mike Groff, 18-Jack Hewitt, 20-Tyce Carlson, 23-Paul Durant and 29-Joe Gosek
Boat's only IndyCar win. He had been declared the winner at Texas the previous year, but a scoring error was discovered that resulted in Arie Luyendyk getting the win.
John Paul Jr. replaced Groff at Byrd-Cunningham Racing for the remainder of the season.

New England 200
The New England 200 was held on June 28 at New Hampshire International Speedway. Billy Boat qualified on the pole position.

Top ten results
 1- Tony Stewart
 4- Scott Goodyear
 8- Scott Sharp
 6- Davey Hamilton
 5- Arie Luyendyk
 15- Eliseo Salazar
 91- Buddy Lazier
 28- Mark Dismore
 51- Eddie Cheever
 3- Robbie Buhl
Stewart's final IndyCar win.
Boat was involved in a large crash lap 95 and missed the next two races.
Team owner John Menard Jr. believed that A. J. Foyt Enterprises was cheating and withdrew his car driven by Robbie Buhl from the next two races. His other car, driven by Stewart, was not withdrawn as it was leading the point standings.

Pep Boys 400K
The Pep Boys 400K was held on July 19 at Dover Downs International Speedway. Tony Stewart qualified on the pole position.

Top 10 results
 8- Scott Sharp
 91- Buddy Lazier
 16- Marco Greco
 6- Davey Hamilton
 77- Stephan Gregoire
 4- Scott Goodyear
 23- Jim Guthrie
 1- Tony Stewart
 5- Arie Luyendyk
 14- Kenny Bräck
Failed to qualify: 15-Eliseo Salazar
Greg Ray replaced the injured Billy Boat. He started 7th, but crashed with Eddie Cheever on lap 104 and finished 15th.
Only 10 of the 22 starters were running at the finish.

VisionAire 500K
The VisionAire 500K was held on July 25 at Charlotte Motor Speedway. Tony Stewart qualified on the pole position.

Top 10 results
 14- Kenny Bräck
 35- Jeff Ward
 4- Scott Goodyear
 5- Arie Luyendyk
 16- Marco Greco
 10- John Paul Jr.
 6- Davey Hamilton
 77- Stéphan Grégoire
 40- Jack Miller
 21- Stevie Reeves
Bräck's first IndyCar win.

Radisson 200
The Radisson 200 was held August 16 at Pikes Peak International Raceway. Billy Boat qualified on the pole position.

Top 10 results
 14- Kenny Bräck
 3- Robbie Buhl
 1- Tony Stewart
 77- Stéphan Grégoire
 6- Davey Hamilton
 16- Marco Greco
 91- Buddy Lazier
 51- Eddie Cheever
 11- Billy Boat
 98- Donnie Beechler
Boat returned in this race. He qualified on the pole position and finished 9th, one lap down.
Buhl also returned in this race, finishing 2nd after starting 6th.

Atlanta 500 Classic
The Atlanta 500 Classic was held on August 29 at Atlanta Motor Speedway. Billy Boat qualified on the pole position.

Top 10 results
 14- Kenny Bräck
 6- Davey Hamilton
 51- Eddie Cheever
 4- Scott Goodyear
 1- Tony Stewart
 35- Jeff Ward
 28- Mark Dismore
 5- Arie Luyendyk
 15- Andy Michner
 30- Raul Boesel

Lone Star 500
The Lone Star 500 was held on September 20 at Texas Motor Speedway. Billy Boat qualified on the pole position.

Top 10 results
 10- John Paul Jr.
 52- Robby Unser
 35- Jeff Ward
 23- Roberto Guerrero
 14- Kenny Bräck
 91- Buddy Lazier
 3- Robbie Buhl
 19- Stan Wattles
 6- Davey Hamilton
 28- Mark Dismore
Paul's second and final IndyCar win. 16 years earlier, he won the 1983 Michigan 500 at Michigan International Speedway.
Entering the season finale, Bräck led Hamilton by 31 points and Tony Stewart by 41 points.

Las Vegas 500K
The Las Vegas 500K was held on October 11 at Las Vegas Motor Speedway. Billy Boat qualified on the pole position.

Top 10 results
 5- Arie Luyendyk
 99- Sam Schmidt
 91- Buddy Lazier
 10- John Paul Jr.
 51- Eddie Cheever
 81- Brian Tyler
 3- Robbie Buhl
 16- Marco Greco
 18- Steve Knapp
 14- Kenny Bräck
Luyendyk's final IndyCar win. It would also be his final season as a full-time driver, as he would choose to go into semi-retirement in 1999.
Of the championship contenders, Tony Stewart started 2nd, but spun on lap seven and finished 14th (30 laps down), Davey Hamilton was involved in a crash with Roberto Guerrero on lap 130, finishing 19th. Bräck cruised the rest of the way to finish 10th, six laps down, enough to win the championship.

Driver standings 

 Ties in points broken by number of wins, followed by number of 2nds, 3rds, etc., and then by number of pole positions, followed by number of times qualified 2nd, etc.
Additional points were awarded to the pole winner (3 points), the second best qualifier (2 points), the third best qualifier (1 point) and to the driver leading the most laps (2 point).

Notes:
Orlando: No additional points for the qualifying were awarded due to rain; starting grid were determined by 1996–97 entrant points for the first 20 positions and the remaining eight went to top practice times from Thursday.
Phoenix: Scott Sharp had 7 points deduction, because his car failed the post-race fuel capacity inspection.
Pikes Peak: Tony Stewart and Robbie Buhl had 15 points deduction each, because the rear wings of both Team Menard cars were found to be in violation of technical specifications.

See also 
 1998 Indianapolis 500
 1998 Indy Lights season
 1998 CART season
 1998 Toyota Atlantic Championship season
 http://champcarstats.com/year/1998i.htm
 http://media.indycar.com/pdf/2011/IICS_2011_Historical_Record_Book_INT6.pdf  (p. 140–141)

Footnotes

Indy Racing League
IndyCar Series seasons
 
Indy Racing League